Fiorite is a hydrated silica rock, a form of opal, found in cavities in volcanic tuff. It is a globular, botryoidal or stalactic concretionary form of opal. It has a pearly lustre and forms botryoidal masses. It was named after Santa Fiora, in Italy. It is used as a gemstone.

See also
Geyserite

References

Mindat with location data

Opals
Industrial minerals